The Garda Síochána Ombudsman Commission (GSOC) is an independent statutory body in Ireland charged with overseeing the Garda Síochána, the national police force. It is a three-member body established under the Garda Síochána Act 2005 to deal with complaints from members of the public about the conduct of Gardaí (police officers).

The commission was established in December 2005, and replaced the Garda Síochána Complaints Board. The Commission has more powers than its predecessor and, unlike the Complaints Board, it is not made up of members of the force. The first three commissioners were appointed in February 2006 and the commission commenced hearing complaints in May 2007.

The current chairperson is Rory MacCabe, who was appointed in January 2022.

Powers, functions and membership
It is empowered to:

 Directly and independently investigate complaints against members of the Garda Síochána
 Investigate any matter, even where no complaint has been made, where it appears that a Garda may have committed an offence or behaved in a way that would justify disciplinary proceedings
 Investigate any practice, policy or procedure of the Garda Síochána with a view to reducing the incidence of related complaints

The GSOC is mandated to provide an independent and effective civilian oversight of policing and to deal with the public's complaints concerning Gardaí fairly and efficiently so that everyone can have confidence in the complaints system.

Three people make up the GSOC. As of January 2022, the commissioners are Rory MacCabe, Emily Logan and Hugh Hume.

In budget 2019 GSOC's budget was increased and additional staff were allocated with the Minister for Justice expressing his confidence that this would help it function.

Annual reports

2007
GSOC deal with many complaints each year. According to its 2007 Annual Report, in its first year the GSOC received 2,084 complaints from members of the public and 294 referrals from the Garda Commissioner. A total of 556 allegations were deemed inadmissible.  Since the inception of the office, the GSOC had sent nine files to the Director of Public Prosecutions (DPP), five of which the director decided not to proceed with prosecution. A decision on the other four were pending.

Corrib gas controversy
Because of the large number of complaints in 2007 from County Mayo, arising from protests linked to the Corrib gas controversy, the Commission wrote to then Minister for Justice, Equality and Law Reform Brian Lenihan requesting a review of how the protests were policed under section 106 of the Garda Síochána Act. The minister said he "did not feel it was appropriate to proceed". His successor Dermot Ahern gave a similar answer in the Dáil when the request was repeated by Sinn Féin two months later.

The GSOC recommended that disciplinary action be taken against an unnamed senior member of the Garda Síochána in relation to the handling of a Shell to Sea protest in north Mayo. The GSOC investigation was undertaken under section 95 of the Garda Síochána Act 2005, after receipt of complaints over Garda handling of a protest at Pollathomas pier in June 2007. Some 20 civilians and two Gardaí were injured when a landowner objected to trespass on his property by contractors for Shell EP Ireland. Some 68 Gardaí were contacted by the GSOC, a move criticised by the Association of Garda Sergeants and Inspectors.

The GSOC had received up to October 2009 a total of 111 complaints in regard to policing of the protests, of which 78 were deemed admissible. The DPP was sent seven files but did not authorise criminal prosecution of Gardaí in any of the seven cases.

2008
In 2008, a total of 4,227 allegations arose from 2,681 complaints. Allegations of abuse of authority, neglect of duty and discourtesy constituted 75 per cent of complaints received. Assault accounted for 13 per cent. A total of 1,360 allegations were deemed inadmissible. The 2008 report revealed that 31 files were sent to the Director of Public Prosecutions (DPP), identifying 44 potential defendants. The DPP gave 11 directions for prosecution. One Garda was convicted of dangerous driving, arising from a GSOC investigation of an incident in 2007. Ten others were awaiting court dates at the end of 2008, the report said. The DPP gave 30 directions for no prosecution. The GSOC received 129 referrals from the Garda Commissioner, in cases in which it appeared to the commissioner that the conduct of a Garda may have resulted in the death of, or serious harm to, a person.

2011
In February 2011 the Commission rejected allegations by the Garda Representative Association that it behaved in an "excessive and oppressive" manner when gathering evidence in the case of a Garda who was charged with assault.

2012
In December 2012, the GSOC exercised its powers of arrest for the first time, detaining a County Galway Garda for questioning in relation to an allegation of sexual assault.

2014
In March 2014, the GSOC was reported to be investigating a case in which a mother-of-one, who was viciously assaulted in Galway, says a Garda lied to her about the scheduling of a number of court dates for the case.

In May 2014, the GSOC was reported to be investigating the death of a teenager whose body was found in a stream close to the Sallybrook estate of garda superintendent Michael Leacy in Dungarvan, County Waterford. The boy, who was reported to have "received injuries", was described as "a quiet young lad" who "loved music and football, like any lad" and who was "doing a course in sports and recreation" at the time of his death.

In May 2014, the GSOC was reported to be investigating a fatal car crash which occurred after Gardaí followed a car in Dublin.

Surveillance controversy

On Sunday 9 February 2014, the Irish edition of The Sunday Times led with a story written by journalist John Mooney. In it he outlined how the Garda Síochána Ombudsman Commission had suspected that it was under surveillance. Mooney explained how GSOC had hired the services of a UK counter-surveillance firm, Verrimus, to investigate.

A briefing, given to Justice Minister Alan Shatter was subsequently leaked to the media, outlining the investigation.

2015
The chairman of GSOC, Simon O'Brien, resigned his job from 30 January to take up a position with the Pensions Ombudsman Service in the UK. There had been calls for his resignation by Alan Shatter and representatives of the 1,000 rank-and-file Gardaí based in Dublin's South Central Division over the Surveillance controversy.

In March 2015, "based on the level of public disquiet it generated" it was announced that GSOC would investigate an incident whereby a homeless man was handcuffed, pepper sprayed and trampled on by a Garda on Henry Street.

In November 2015, footage emerged of a civilian being attacked with a police baton in County Wexford. The matter was referred to GSOC.

In the same month a young man died while in police custody at Dublin Airport. The matter was also referred to GSOC.

2016
In February 2016, it was reported that the wife of former garda press officer Superintendent David Taylor made a complaint to GSOC over a failure to preserve evidence.

In May 2016, the Irish Examiner reported that GSOC queried the independence of the inquiry that produced the Guerin Report and attempted to have it extend its timeframe of investigation so as to complete its work more thoroughly.

Commissioners 
  denotes chairpersons

See also
 Ombudsman for the Defence Forces (ODF)

References

Note

External links
 Ombudsman Commission

2005 establishments in Ireland
Ombudsman
Law enforcement in the Republic of Ireland
 
Organizations established in 2005
Police misconduct in Ireland
Police oversight organizations
Department of Justice (Ireland)